The Canon EF-S 10–22mm 3.5–4.5 USM lens is a wide to ultra-wide angle zoom lens for Canon digital single-lens reflex cameras with a Canon EF-S lens mount.
The field of view has a 35 mm equivalent focal length of 16–35mm, which is analogous to the EF 16–35mm 2.8L on a full-frame camera. The 10–22mm is an internal focusing lens. Of the 13 elements, one is of Canon's Super Ultra-Low Dispersion glass and three are aspherical elements.

Reception

Praise
The 10–22 is considered to have good image quality (sharp and low distortion) and build. The optical construction is similar to L-series lenses, but it is not designated as L-series (as reflected in the build quality), which some have argued is for marketing reasons, as with the 17–55.

 "This is an extremely sharp lens, at all three tested focal lengths."

 "There is moderate barrel distortion at 10mm, a negligible amount at 15mm, and only a tiny amount of pincushion distortion at 22mm. Overall, exemplary performance in this measure."
 "This lens is small, light and solidly built. Sometimes Canon's non-L series lenses can feel a bit cheap, but not this one. … there is little to fault about it with regard to either fit or finish."

Criticism
Cost is the biggest criticism; until fairly recently, the 10–22 cost as much as many L-series lenses, but is only usable on APS-C cameras, and thus is questionable as a long-term investment. Others think this less of a concern.

Chromatic aberration is somewhat high at 10mm, and vignetting is measurable at 10mm and maximum aperture (0.85 EV units), but not terribly noticeable in normal use.

Use
Optimal aperture (for sharpness and to reduce vignetting) is 5.6 to 8; 8 is particularly recommended at 22mm.

Filters exacerbate vignetting, hence thin filters are recommended at 10mm, and stacking filters is discouraged.

Similar lenses
In May 2014, Canon announced a less expensive alternative wide-angle zoom for APS-C bodies, the EF-S 10–18mm. The new lens, which is being sold alongside the 10–22, is slower than the 10–22 (maximum aperture range of 4.5–5.6) and also lacks a USM motor, but adds both image stabilization and Canon's stepping motor technology. It is also smaller and lighter than the 10–22.

Sigma offers two ultra-wide angle lenses for APS-C sensors—the 8–16 DC and 10–20 DC. Tamron also offers a 10–24mm ultra-wide zoom lens for APS-C cameras as well as an older 11–18mm lens.

In May 2008, "PhotoZone" considered the Tokina 11–16mm, f/2.8, introduced in 2008, to be the best ultra-wide angle lens available for Canon APS-C Format cameras.

References

External links

Specifications
 Press release on DPreview
 Canon Technical Specifications

Camera lenses introduced in 2004
10-22mm lens